The Will is a 1921 British silent drama film directed by A. V. Bramble and starring Milton Rosmer, Evangeline Hilliard and Anthony Holles. It was based on the 1914 play The Will by J. M. Barrie.

Cast
 Milton Rosmer - Philip Ross 
 Evangeline Hilliard - Emily Ross 
 Anthony Holles - Charles Ross
 J. Fisher White - Mr. Devises 
 Alec Fraser - Robert Devises 
 Reginald Bach - Lord Chelsea 
 Mary Brough - Bessie

References

External links
 

1921 films
British drama films
British silent feature films
Films directed by A. V. Bramble
1921 drama films
British films based on plays
Films based on works by J. M. Barrie
Ideal Film Company films
British black-and-white films
1920s English-language films
1920s British films
Silent drama films